Diego Ramírez de Fuenleal (7 December 1459 – 11 August 1537) (also known as Diego Ramírez de Haro, Diego Ramírez de Villaescusa, or Diego Ramírez de Arellano) was a Roman Catholic prelate who served as Bishop of Cuenca (1518–1537), Bishop of Málaga (1500–1518), and Bishop of Astorga (1498–1500).

Biography
Diego Ramírez de Fuenleal was born on 7 December 1459.
In 1498, he was appointed during the papacy of Pope Alexander VI as Bishop of Astorga.
On 7 February 1500, he was appointed during the papacy of Pope Alexander VI as Bishop of Málaga.
In 1518, he was appointed during the papacy of Pope Leo X as Bishop of Cuenca.
He served as Bishop of Cuenca until his death on 11 August 1537. 
While bishop, he was the principal co-consecrator of Fernando Valdés, Bishop of Elne (1529).

References

External links and additional sources
 (for Chronology of Bishops) 
 (for Chronology of Bishops) 
 (for Chronology of Bishops) 
 (for Chronology of Bishops) 
 (for Chronology of Bishops) 
 (for Chronology of Bishops) 

15th-century Roman Catholic bishops in Castile
Bishops appointed by Pope Alexander VI
Bishops appointed by Pope Leo X
1459 births
1537 deaths